The Milton Rooms is an arts centre and hub for cultural and community led activities (including theatre, comedy, dance, exhibitions, music and auctions) located in Malton, North Yorkshire, a market town in England.

The main body of the building was built in 1930 by the Fitzwilliam family over the 19th century Masonic Lodge which is still in use. This section of the building includes a theatre with the largest sprung dance floor in North Yorkshire and the Fitzwilliam Room; a bar renovated in 2011 as a studio theatre.

At the back of the Milton Rooms are the Grade II listed Assembly Rooms. They were formerly the Literary Institute and Subscription Rooms Built in 1814 also by the Fitzwilliam family.

The Milton Rooms was given its name by the Fitzwilliam family and originates from their family home Milton Hall.

The Milton Rooms is now a Charitable Trust, run by a board of trustees and operated by volunteers under the remit of Ryedale District Council.

References

External links

YouTube

Buildings and structures in North Yorkshire
Arts centres in England
Malton, North Yorkshire